Pishva County is in Tehran province, Iran. The capital of the county is the city of Pishva. At the 2006 census, the region's population (as Pishva District of Varamin County) was 69,995 in 17,288 households. The following census in 2011 counted 75,454 people in 20,629 households, by which time the district had been separated from the county to form Pishva County. At the 2016 census the county's population was 86,601, in 25,704 households.

Administrative divisions

The population history and structural changes of Pishva County's administrative divisions over three consecutive censuses are shown in the following table. The latest census shows two districts, four rural districts, and one city.

References

 

Counties of Tehran Province